The Royal Canadian Sea Cadets (RCSC) is a Canadian national youth program sponsored by the Canadian Armed Forces and the civilian Navy League of Canada. Administered by the Canadian Forces, the program is funded through the Department of National Defence, with the civilian partner providing support in the local community. Cadets are not members of the Canadian Armed Forces.

Overview

Along with the Royal Canadian Army Cadets and Royal Canadian Air Cadets, the Royal Canadian Sea Cadets form part of the Canadian Cadet Organizations. Although the RCSCC and the other cadet programs are sponsored by the Canadian Forces and the civilian Leagues, cadets are not members of the Forces and are not expected to join. In keeping with Commonwealth custom, the Royal Canadian Sea Cadets stand first in the order of precedence, before the Army Cadets and Air Cadets. This is in keeping with the Royal Navy's status as the Senior Service, a tradition common to most Commonwealth navies.

An inclusive program, youth aged 12 to 18 may join the RCSCC. There is no enrollment fee, and uniforms are loaned at no charge. The organization and rank system is similar to that of the Royal Canadian Navy. Adult leadership is provided by members of the Canadian Forces Reserve Subcomponent Cadet Organization Administration and Training Service, composed mostly of officers of the Cadet Instructor Cadre (CIC) Branch, supplemented, if necessary, by contracted Civilian Instructors, authorized adult volunteers, and, on occasion, officers and non-commissioned members of other CF branches. The CIC Branch is specifically trained to serve the Royal Canadian Sea, Army, and Air Cadet training programs, and like all reservists, they come from all walks of life and all parts of the community. Some are former cadets, and many have former regular or reserve force service.

Aim
The aim of the Royal Canadian Sea Cadets is to develop in youth the attributes of good citizenship and leadership; promote physical fitness, and stimulate the interest of youth in the sea, land and air activities of the Canadian Forces. The RCSC shares this aim with the Army and Air Cadets; however, each discipline focuses on its own parent element.

History

Early days
In 1895, due to concern over the Royal Navy's ability to provide adequate naval defence, concerned citizens formed the Navy League, to promote interest in the problems of maritime trade and defence.

The League formed local branches throughout the United Kingdom and in other countries of the British Empire. The earliest Canadian branch was formed in Toronto. Its warrant (Warrant No. 5) is dated December 10, 1895, and currently hangs in the Navy League of Canada's National Office.

At that time, Canadian branches supported a cadet program called the Boys’ Naval Brigades, aimed at encouraging young men to consider a seafaring career and provide basic training in citizenship and seamanship.

Evolution
With the formation of the Canadian Naval Service in May 1910, the organisation was renamed from "Boys’ Naval Brigade" to "Navy League Sea Cadets," to permit closer liaison with the Navy. In 1942, King George VI graciously consented to be Admiral of the Navy League's Sea Cadets, and granted the "Royal" prefix, causing another name change, to the current "Royal Canadian Sea Cadets." Queen Elizabeth continued this Royal patronage and named His Royal Highness the Duke of Edinburgh as the Admiral of the RCSC. Finally, in 1941, the RCN became a joint partner with the Navy League in support of the RCSC.

Girls
In 1950, the Navy League of Canada established the  Wrenette program for girls aged 13 to 18 years, though at least one corps (in Victoria, BC) unofficially existed before that date.  Starting in 1975, girls were permitted to become sea cadets (as well as army and air cadets), making the Wrenette Corps largely redundant.  As a result, the Wrenette program steadily declined until it was disbanded in 1997.

Memorial

At the Royal Military College of Canada, outside Currie Hall in Kingston, Ontario, stained glass windows relate to the history of the Royal Canadian Sea Cadets. 
 Donated as a tribute to all national presidents of the Navy League of Canada for the proven love of country in promoting patriotism... seapower ... youth training, the window bestows 'Honour and Glory to patriotic citizens who have and will serve Canada.' The window features images of the Royal Canadian Sea Cadets, Navy League Cadets and Navy League Wrenettes.
 In memory of David H. Gibson, C.B.E. national president, Navy League of Canada, 1938–1952 a stained glass window features images of a young sailor and God behind the ships' wheel. The window is dedicated to Canadians who in defence of the country went down to the sea in ships. The window includes a poem by H.R. Gillarm: "Proudly in ships they sailed to sea. Ahead their goal, perhaps eternity. But with God as their pilot they had no fear facing all danger as their course was clear. Their cargo? The record of their life. Some good, some bad, some peace, some strife."

Navy League today
In 1995, the Navy League of Canada celebrated its 100th Anniversary. The League promotes the same subjects today, as at its founding: knowledge of, and support for, maritime interests. On a national level, the League supports the International Exchange Program, certain scholarships, and the National Sea Cadet Regatta, while local branches provide vital logistical support to individual RCSC Corps.

Corps

Individual cadets belong to units called Royal Canadian Sea Cadet Corps (RCSCC), or Corps de cadet de la Marine royale canadienne (CCMRC), which are the basic operating units of the program. Each corps comprises Canadian Forces Officers of the Reserve Cadet Instructors Cadre Branch, often assisted by Civilian Instructors (CI), and cadets.

The entirety of a given corps organizes itself as a ship's company, employing the naval divisional system. Under this system, cadets become members of a division under a cadet petty officer (Divisional Petty Officer or DPO) and, ideally, a commissioned officer of the CIC (Divisional Officer or DivO), although the officer position is sometimes filled by a civilian. Cadets parade by divisions, and are expected to route grievances and requests through the chain of command, running either directly from the DPO to DivO to the executive officer (XO) to the commanding officer (CO) or from the DPO to the cadet Regulating Petty Officer (RPO, the second senior cadet in the unit), to the cadet Coxswain (Cox'n, the senior cadet in a unit). The chain stops at the level able to deal with a concern – for example, a cadet's request for a new item of uniform might result in the DivO giving approval, and directing the cadet to visit Stores.

All but the smallest corps staff several departments, typically including Training, Administration, and Supply, while larger units maintain training-support organizations, including Range, Band, Sail training, PERI (Physical Education and Recreational Instruction) and more.  Each Cadet Corps is unique and may offer different teams depending on Cadet interests.

Training, Administration, and Supply operate under the direction of Canadian Forces staff, possibly with an adult assistant, and a senior cadet, while the others, with the exception of Range, are often run by a senior cadet. Units generally adhere to the school schedule, meeting weekly for mandatory training, and carrying out additional training on weekends and other weeknights. The primary meeting is referred to as a parade night, while overnight weekend training conducted at the unit's home is called a live-aboard. Anything taking the unit away from its home is generally termed an exercise.

Primary Departments

 The Training Department comprises the Training Officer (TrgO), Training Chief or Petty Officer (TrgCPO/PO), and a staff of senior cadets and adult staff, often with other duties within the unit, serving as instructors for the Phase Training Program – the basic Sea Cadet syllabus. The TrgCPO/PO is often responsible for maintaining each cadet's training record, as well as handling resources and rating instructors.
 The Administration Department comprises the Administration Officer (AdmO) and Administration Chief or Petty Officer (AdmCPO/PO), who wears the quill-pen and scroll badge of a Ship's Writer, and may be referred to as such. Administration handles all incoming and outgoing mail, as well as maintaining corps records other than those specifically handled by Training or Supply.
 The Supply (or Stores) Department is composed of a Supply (or Stores) Officer, sometimes assisted by a senior cadet, who is entitled to wear the crossed-keys badge of a Storesman. The Supply Department is responsible for all equipment belonging to the corps; however, Supply tends to be primarily concerned with issuing cadets uniforms and related gear – bands often deal with their own gear, as do competitive teams.

Other groups

 Range Team: Most units will have at least one trained Range Safety Officer (RSO) and conduct, as part of the mandatory training programme, training in safe and effective marksmanship using either the Daisy Air Rifle, which is not rated as a firearm, and thus may be used in almost any location of sufficient size, or, with the proper indoor or outdoor firing range, the .22 calibre No 7 Lee–Enfield or Anschütz bolt action target rifles. A number of corps field range teams, competing in cadet tri-service matches at the area, regional, and national level, while others simply offer a well-supervised recreational shooting program.
 The .22 rifles are, today, usually held by corps fielding a biathlon team. The Lee–Enfields are, except for the barrel, virtually indistinguishable from those used by Commonwealth forces in WWII and Korea, while the Anschutz are purpose-made target rifles. Recently, concern over lead levels resulted in the closure of indoor small-arms ranges used by cadets, causing many units to search for appropriately certified and willing civilian outdoor ranges. Firearm safety is given the highest priority throughout this training.
 Biathlon: An increasing number of RCSC Corps have formed biathlon teams, adding a new aspect to the long-standing marksmanship programs, and encouraging a high degree of athleticism and physical fitness. Alongside those other benefits, it offers an alternate focus for land-locked units unable to offer a local sailing program. Ideally, cadets train and compete with Anschutz .22 target rifles; however, due to a lack of suitable ranges, some corps train with air rifles in accordance with Olympic marksmanship standards.
 Sail: Many units run a sailing program using small dinghies, typically Echo- or 420-class vessels, although other comparable designs are used, including echos, Lasers, the Olympic-class 470, Flying Juniors, as well as the older Albacores and International Cadets. At the corps level, the sailing program is often taught by a civilian sailing instructor, supervised by a member of the Canadian Forces.  The instructor may be assisted by trained cadets.  The RCSC sailing program uses Canadian Yachting Association levels and material for all training. Corps sailing instruction is supported by regional Sail Centres, staffed by a Coordinating Officer, several Canadian Yachting Association (CYA) certified Head Instructors and volunteer staff cadet instructors. Advanced training focus on competitive sailing and race organization.
 Band: Most units larger than thirty people will try to support some sort of musical ensemble, whether drum and bugle, drum and bell (glockenspiel), a military band, or just a drum line. A very few corps have a piper or two, while an even smaller group maintain pipe bands, rare due to both the lack of a Naval tradition of piping, and the comparative expense of the instruments.
 Guard/ Honour Guard: Many units have a division called "Guard". The Guard is a division where anyone from the rank of AB and up can join. Most units carry the old No. 4 Mk. 1 Long-Branch Rifle and wear webbing. The Guard is usually after the Flag Party in ceremonies.
 Boatshed: This support department handles all the water-related needs of the corps, including maintenance of the sailing dinghies and other small craft, as well as supporting seamanship instruction off the water.
 Canteen: Operated by the local sponsoring group with proceeds for corps activities, the canteen typically sells pop, chips, and the like at breaks in training. Some also offer cadets various necessities such as thread, boot polish, and starch. More ambitious corps canteens offer unit clothing, typically sweatshirts, T-shirts, belt buckles, etc., suitably emblazoned with unit insignia, mottos, and the like.

Sponsoring Group
 Along with the Army Cadets and Air Cadets, the Sea Cadets make up a program sponsored by the Canadian Forces funded primarily through the Department of National Defence. The Canadian Forces provides training, pay and allowances for reserve force cadet instructors; uniforms for instructors and cadets; transportation, facilities and staff for summer training; the training program and training aids; and policy and regulation regarding the operation of the cadet organization.
 The primary local community sponsor for Sea Cadets is a local branch of the Navy League of Canada that is often a committee of parents supported by groups such as Royal Canadian Legion branch, or some similar service club; i.e. Lions, Rotary, etc. The civilian Navy League provides local support by way of accommodation, utilities, liability insurance, transportation and training aids not provided by the CF. Navy League branches rely on community support, in the form of direct donations of money and goods, trusts, and various forms of fund-raising efforts. These last include sale of various items, much like bake and chocolate bar sales, street-corner pin and tag sales by cadets, and funds raised through the attached cadet unit's own canteen.

Training and ranks

For a more complete discussion of RCSC Winter Training, please see Royal Canadian Sea Cadet Training

In accordance with QR and O Cadets 4.11 the following are the rank badges of the Royal Canadian Sea Cadets:
In addition to the rank-specific criteria given below, all appointments are subject to the approval of the cadet's commanding officer, who generally promotes based on the advice of Divisional Officers and unit training staff.

As a note, the official phrasing for the Petty Officer and Chief Petty Officer ranks is "Petty Officer Cadet First (or Second) Class," and "Chief Petty Officer Cadet First (or Second) Class." However, outside of Cadet Administrative and Training Orders (CATO), and Queen's Regulations and Orders (Cadets) (QR&O(Cdt)), custom omits "Cadet" in casual reference. Thus, Petty Officer First Class is the customary rendering. Generally, where there is a need to distinguish between cadets and Canadian Forces members, the NCO ranks will be written or spoken as Cadet Petty Officer First Class, abbreviated as C/PO1.    
   
Additionally, while it is customary within the organisation to refer to a cadet receiving a rank as being "promoted," the official documentation refers to such an act as an "appointment."

Ranks

Forms of address 
 Junior cadets are typically addressed by their last name by all ranks; however, a superior might address them as simply "cadet," especially in situations where names are not known, such as at multi-unit events.
 Petty officers are typically addressed by their juniors as "Petty Officer So-and-So," or, conversationally, as "P.O." Superiors and equals will often use last name only, sometimes prefacing it with "Mr." or "Miss."
 Chief petty officers are typically addressed by all personnel as "Chief So-and-So," or, conversationally, as "chief." Superiors and equals will rarely use last name only, though superiors might replace "chief" with "Mr." or "Miss."
 Additionally, cadets often hold an appointment in addition to their rank, and many of these are used as an alternate form of address, especially the following: coxswain (cox'n); corps gunner, chief gunner, or gunner's mate ("gunner"), drum major ("drum major" or "drummie"); bugler; messenger; and boatswain, boatswain's mate, chief boatswain's mate, and chief boatswain ("bosun" or "buffer").
 In formal situations (for example, being called up for an award or promotion), a cadet's full rank and last name is often used.

Summer Training

Summer Training Centres (CTC), officially termed as either Sea Cadet Summer Training Centres or Establishments, and referred to colloquially year-round as "camps," and, by their ship's company over the summer, as "the base," provide additional training intended to support or complement that offered at the home unit from September to June. Across the board, cadets applying for summer training must have 75% attendance over the winter training year, as well as meeting certain course prerequisites.

Summer training facilities are staffed by members of the Canadian Forces, primarily members of the CIC, but also including other branches of the CF, and senior cadets selected for employment as staff cadets. Sea Cadet STCs are commanded by a CIC officer of the rank of commander. Most employ staff cadets at the ranks of Petty Officer Second Class through Chief Petty Officer First Class, with a CPO1 being appointed as Cadet Cox'n. Additionally, some employ staff cadets at the rank of Master Seaman for support positions. Staff cadets are paid at a percentage of a CF Naval Cadet's (officer trainee) basic pay.

The centres are commissioned as "stone frigates," which is to say, naval shore establishments granted much the same standing as a seagoing unit.

Current Cadet Training Centres (CTC)

 CTC HMCS Quadra, located in Comox, British Columbia, has operated as a Sea Cadet training facility since 1953.  It was commissioned in 1956 and is the second largest summer training facility.  It employs over 100 officers and 150 staff cadets each year. The Centre occupies Goose Spit opposite Comox, and makes use of Highland Secondary School as an auxiliary training facility for classroom work, first aid, and music training. Quadra is the only Sea Cadet Training Centre in Canada to include all four trades plus two of the three speciality trades (Marine Engineering, and Shipwright). Cadets undergoing training as Boatswains and Marine Engineers also undergo training in damage control at CFB Esquimalt.  Quadra plays host to a number of international exchange cadets. In recent years, these have included contingents from South Korea, Japan, the United States, United Kingdom, Germany, Sweden, Australia, New Zealand, Bermuda, and the Netherlands.
 CTC HMCS Ontario, located in Kingston, Ontario HMCS ONTARIO Sea Cadet Summer Training Centre  began life as Cadets Camp Frontenac (sailing camp) on 4 July 1977, and was officially redesignated as HMCS ONTARIO Cadet summer Training Establishment on 13 July 1981 thus allowing ONTARIO to expand and to offer a wider range of training opportunities to sea cadets from across Ontario and Canada in disciplines such as music, sail, seamanship, drill and ceremonial and the two-week general training course.  All of which include sports, first aid, instructional technique, and leadership training.  The course duration of two, three and six weeks represent ascending levels of experience and greater challenge and  provides a definitive learning experience for cadets, designed to augment and enhance training from their hometown corps. In the summer months ONTARIO's small cadre of full-time staff are supplemented by 110 officers, non commissioned member and civilian instructors of the COATS and over 100 sea cadets who are offered summer employment as staff cadets.  ONTARIO delivers training to over 800 cadets, young men and women aged 12 to 18. In addition to its primary mission of summer training HMCS ONTARIO is also a year-round operation, responsible for sail training and the operational standards of nine sail centres and a staff of 80 part-time officers and civilian instructors who staff the sail centres located across the province of Ontario in the spring and fall.  Since 1982 HMCS ONTARIO's main headquarters has been located at CFB KINGSTON with the main summer training centre located on the grounds of the Royal Military College.  The Centre takes its name from HMCS ONTARIO a Minotaur class light cruiser built for the Royal Navy as HMS Minotaur (53), but transferred to the Royal Canadian Navy on completion and renamed Ontario.
 CTC HMCS Acadia, located in Cornwallis, Nova Scotia, is the largest summer training facility.  During the course of the summer, Acadia is home to roughly 1200 cadets who are undergoing training.  Acadia provides training in Music, Sail, Drill and Ceremonial, and Seamanship training. It is known for a strong Royal Canadian Air Cadet presence amongst both course and staff cadets. HMCS Acadia, much like HMCS Quadra, hosts an international contingent. In 2006, HMCS Acadia celebrated 50 years as a Sea Cadet Summer Training Centre.  HMCS Acadia's website

Additionally, cadets may apply for a number of tri-service courses, some hosted by Sea Cadet Summer Training Centres and others held on Army or Air Cadet facilities. Currently various forms of music training are offered as tri-service to some extent. In past years the Air-heavy Introduction to Aerospace course was offered as tri-service; however, this seems to have lapsed.

Former SCSTC
 HMCS Haida, the historic Destroyer that fought in WW2 and now a National Historic site, was home to a unique six week long Boatswain trade training course during the summer in the 1970's. At that time HMCS Haida was museum ship located in Toronto, Ontario. Approximately 30 Sea Cadets would live aboard, sleep in hammocks like the original crew, and follow a realistic ship's routine for six weeks while training. They would also double as museum guides for periods during the day. On at least one occasion, select cadets were offered the opportunity to use their new skills after graduating from the course. In 1975 four cadets were selected to serve a three week stint aboard Canadian Coast Guard vessels at sea, sailing from Halifax, Nova Scotia.
SCSTC HMCS Avalon, located in St. John's, Newfoundland, was, at its closing, the smallest SCSTC in Canada.  It offered training in either basic sail or beginner band.
 SCSTC HMCS Qu'Appelle was located at the Echo Valley Conference Centre, formerly the Fort San sanatorium, near Fort Qu'Appelle, Saskatchewan, an hour north east of Regina, Saskatchewan. HMCS Qu'Appelle offered the introductory Two-Week General Training course, and Trade Groups One through Three of the Music and Sail courses. HMCS Qu'Appelle last offered courses in 2004.
 SCSTC HMCS Gimli, HMCS Qu'Appelle's predecessor, was located in Hnausa, Manitoba.
 SCSTC HMCS Québec, located in Sainte-Angèle-de-Laval, Quebec, was the only SCSTC that was entirely francophone.  It trained cadets in all four trades as well as the Shipwright speciality course. Québec occupied a school during the summer season. The training centre opened its doors in 1975, and offered its last summer courses in 2012.
 Camp TILLICUM, located outside of North Bay, Ontario on Callander Bay was a detachment of HMCS ONTARIO offering Two-Week General Training and Basic Leadership courses.  The camp closed in 1986.
 SCSTC HMCS Micmac located in the Windsor Park region of Halifax, NS.  It trained cadets in Boatswain and Submariner.  The camp closed in the fall of 1988. Boatswain cadets were then transferred to HMCS Acadia.

Honours and awards 
The Canadian Cadet Movement maintains its own Honours and Awards system. Cadets may be awarded these based on criteria including bravery, citizenship, service, outstanding performance on a summer training course, and more. In addition, cadets may also wear, on their uniform, any orders, decorations, and medals of Canada they have been awarded.

Within the system, there are several honours and awards common to all three cadet elements and some that are unique to each. A cadet who transfers from one element to another may continue to wear any medals awarded from their previous service, but in general, sea cadets may be eligible for the following nine honours and awards, and are in the order of precedence:

Vessels

STV Fair Jeanne, built by Capt(N) Thomas G. Fuller, does fall and spring youth sail training group trips on the Great Lakes and St. Lawrence Seaway for organizations such as the Royal Canadian Sea Cadets, Girl Guides of Canada, corporate groups and for people who are working towards The Duke of Edinburgh's Awards.

Symbols

Flags
The Sea Cadets have used a variety of flags during their history: some corps flew the White Ensign until 1929; they then used the Canadian Blue Ensign and the flag of the Navy League of Canada until 1953. In that year, the Chief of Naval Service approved a design for the Royal Canadian Sea Cadet Flag: a white flag with the Union Flag in the canton, and, on the fly, the badge of the Cadets, a gold anchor on a blue roundel surrounded by red maple leaves and surmounted by a Naval Crown. In 1976, the Sovereign approved a new design, which replaced the Union Flag in the canton with the Maple Leaf Flag.

Badge 
The badge is the service emblem of the RCSC, and it is worn on cadet-issued parkas. It is also depicted on the flag of the Royal Canadian Sea Cadets. It is used as a cap badge on the beret worn with Order of Dress C4C.

Uniform
These are the uniforms of the Royal Canadian Sea Cadets. The uniforms are classified by a number system that lays them out as uniforms C1, C2, C5, etc. Uniforms C1A, C3A, C3B, C5, and C5A are issued upon joining, along with Winter Accoutrements.

Order of Dress C1A (Ceremonial Dress):
 White-top
 Corps title cap tally
 Short sleeve white dress shirt
 Black Tie
 Rank slip-ons
 Trousers
 Trousers belt
 Tunic
 Tunic Belt
 Lanyard
 Wool socks
 Parade boots
 Medals and pins, if the cadet has earned them

Order of Dress C2 (Mess Dress): C1A, a white shirt and bowtie is worn by male cadets and a white shirt with crossover tie is worn by female cadets. However, this order of dress is optional and the white shirt and tie are not purchased at public expense. When the tie is worn, the lanyard is not worn. This is very rarely worn.

Order of Dress C3A (Service Dress): C1A, but ribbons replace medals.

Order of Dress C3B (Service Dress): C3A, minus the tunic

Order of Dress C3E (Service Dress): C3A, but black undershirt replace the short sleeve shirt.

Order of Dress C5 (Sea Training Uniform or STU):
 Black ball cap with Corps title
 Black undershirt
 'Postman's blue' shirt
 Trousers
 Trousers belt
 Wool socks
 Parade boots

Order of Dress C5A (STU): C5, minus the Postman's blue shirt.

Order of Dress C5E (Sports Dress) (May be issued kit or personal):
 Sports shorts
 T-shirt
 Running shoes
 Tilley hat

Order of Dress C5B (Field Training Dress or Combats)
 Black beret with RCSC cap badge OR tan tilley hat OR black ball cap
 Olive drab field jacket
 Olive drab field pants
 Field belt
 Wool socks
 Combat boots

Order of Dress C5C (Field Training Dress or Combats): C5B minus the field jacket

Winter Accoutrements (for wear with any order of dress in cold weather):
 Cadet Parka with outer shell and removable liner
 Black gloves
 Black toque with white anchor insignia and the word CADET

Special Orders of Dress
These orders of dress are only used on particular occasions, or by cadets in a Highland pipes and drums band.

Order of Dress C1 (Traditional Dress):
 RCN Uniform (prior to unification)
 RCSC Shoulder flashes, traditional or current
 Seaman's cap with appropriate cap tally
 Chains may replace the lanyard if applicable

Order of Dress C1H (Highland Dress):
 Glengarry Headdress with Sea Cadet metal headdress insignia
 White Dress-Shirt
 Black Tie
 Lanyard
 Tunic (cut-away to accommodate the sporran)
 Kilt Maple leaf tartan
 Boots
 Hosetops
 Flashes, garter
 Spats
 White belt
 Sgian Dubh
 Sporran, hair
 Kilt Pin
 Medals
 Pins

Order of Dress C1H (same code): As above, without tunic.

Key personages

Admiral of the Royal Canadian Sea Cadets
The first Admiral of the Royal Canadian Sea Cadets was George VI, King of Canada, assuming the role in 1942, when the Navy League Sea Cadets became the Royal Canadian Sea Cadets.

Prince Philip, Duke of Edinburgh, as a member of the Canadian Royal Family, was appointed Admiral of the Royal Canadian Sea Cadets in 1953.

Canadian Forces Senior Members
Chief – Reserves and Cadets

Since May 2011, this post has been filled by Rear Admiral Jennifer Bennett, CMM, CD.

Director General Reserves and Cadets

Since March 2011, this post has been filled by Brigadier-General Jay Milne, CD.

Director of Cadets and Junior Rangers

Since 2013, the post has been filled by Colonel Conrad Namiesniowski.

Honorary Members

 Captain (N) Dr. Marc Garneau was appointed as Honorary Captain of the Royal Canadian Sea Cadets; the appointment was not renewed.

See also
 Canadian Forces
 Other Sea Cadet organisations
 Cadets Canada - corporate identity
 History of the Cadet Instructors Cadre
 Canadian Cadet Movement

References

External links 

 Canadian Cadet Organizations
 National RCSC Unit Directory
 International Sea Cadet Association

Canadian Cadet organizations
Youth organizations based in Canada